Illegal, Immoral and Fattening is a 1975 comedy rock album recorded by Howard Kaylan ("Eddie") and Mark Volman ("Flo"). A majority of the album comes from live recordings, including three songs that first appeared in the 1974 film Down and Dirty Duck. Illegal, Immoral and Fattening and Moving Targets were reissued on a single compact disc in 2007 by Acadia Records.

Track listing

Side one
"Illegal, Immoral and Fattening" (Kaylan, Volman) - 3:11
"Rebecca" (Albert Hammond, Michael Hazlewood) - 2:41
"Kama Sutra Time" (Kaylan, Volman, Jim Pons) - 6:40
"The Sanzini Brothers Return (With The Tibetan Memory Trick)" (Kaylan, Volman, Ian Underwood) - 2:50
"Livin' in The Jungle" (Kaylan, Volman) - 3:40

'The Sanzini Brothers' is a reference to the days with Frank Zappa: see Playground Psychotics

Side two
"Cheap" (Kaylan, Volman) - 2:40
"The Kung Fu Killer" (Kaylan, Volman) - 3:00
"Eddie Are You Kidding?" (Volman, Kaylan, Frank Zappa, John Seiter) - 2:22
"The Pop Star Massage Unit" (Kaylan, Volman) - 4:56
"Let Me Make Love To You" (Kaylan, Volman) - 2:20
"There's No Business Like Show Business" (Irving Berlin) - 3:40

"Eddie Are You Kidding?" is a cover of a song they did with Frank Zappa: see Just Another Band from L.A.

Personnel
Howard Kaylan - lead vocals
Mark Volman - vocals, guitar
Phil Reed - lead guitar
Erik Scott - bass
Andy Cahan - keyboards
Craig Krampf - drums
Danny Kootch - guitar on "Let Me Make Love To You"
Leland Sklar - bass on "Let Me Make Love To You"
Ian Underwood - keyboards on "Let Me Make Love To You"
Aynsley Dunbar - drums on "Let Me Make Love To You"

References

Albums produced by Joe Wissert
Flo & Eddie albums
1975 live albums
Columbia Records live albums
Comedy rock albums
1970s comedy albums